Aline is a feminine given name which may refer to:

People
Aline van Barentzen (1897–1981), American classical pianist
Aline Barnsdall (1882–1946), American oil heiress
Aline Bernstein (1880–1955), American costume designer and co-founder of the Museum of Costume Art
Aline Elizabeth Black (1906–1974), American educator
Aline Reese Blondner (1844-1931), American musician and educator
Aline B. Carter,
Aline Camboulives (born 1973), French long-distance runner
Aline Charigot (1859–1915), wife and model of Auguste Renoir
Aline Chrétien (1936–2020), wife of former Canadian prime minister Jean Chrétien
Aline Dias (born 1991), Brazilian actress
Aline Sitoe Diatta (1920–1944), Senegalese heroine of the resistance to French colonialism
Aline Duval,
Aline Ehrlich,
Aline Fruhauf,
Aline Griffith, Countess of Romanones (born 1923–2017), Spanish-American aristocrat, socialite and writer
Aline Rhonie Hofheimer (1909–1963), pioneering female pilot in World War II
Aline Murray Kilmer,
Aline Kiner (1959–2019), French journalist and writer
Aline Kominsky-Crumb (born 1948), underground comics artist
Aline Lahoud, Lebanese singer
Aline Réveillaud de Lens,
Aline Mackinnon,
Aline MacMahon (1899–1991), American actress
Aline McDermott (1881–1951), American actress
Aline Miller, British professor of biomolecular engineering
Aline Mosby,
Aline (footballer, born 1982) (Aline Pellegrino), Brazilian footballer
Aline Pettersson (born 1938), Mexican writer
Aline Marie Raynal (born 1937), French botanist and botanical illustrator
Aline (footballer, born 1989) (Aline Reis), Brazilian footballer
Aline Rhonie,
Aline Caroline de Rothschild,
Aline B. Saarinen,
Aline Mayrisch de Saint-Hubert,
Aline Terry, American tennis champion at the end of the 19th century
Aline Towne (1919–1996), American actress
Aline Valangin,
Aline Valette,
Aline Weber (born 1989), Brazilian model

Fictional characters
a title character of Aline and Valcour, a 1795 epistolary novel by the Marquis de Sade
Aline, a character in Watchmen
Aline Penhallow, from The Shadowhunter Chronicles by Cassandra Clare
the title character of the 1895 novelette The Princess Aline by Richard Harding Davis
Aline, the title character of a eponymous comic strip by Adão Iturrusgarai

Other
the name given to a mummy found in the Tomb of Aline
Aline (film), a 2021 French-Canadian drama film

See also
Alina, a given name

Feminine given names